Exocyst complex component 1 is a protein that in humans is encoded by the EXOC1 gene.

The protein encoded by this gene is a component of the exocyst complex, a multiple protein complex essential for targeting exocytic vesicles to specific docking sites on the plasma membrane. Though best characterized in yeast, the component proteins and functions of the exocyst complex have been demonstrated to be highly conserved in higher eukaryotes. At least eight components of the exocyst complex, including this protein, are found to interact with the actin cytoskeletal remodeling and vesicle transport machinery. Alternatively spliced transcript variants encoding distinct isoforms have been described.

References

Further reading